Tamara Lich is a former logistics worker, and a Canadian right-wing activist known for her involvement in the Yellow Vest protests, the Wexit movement, and the Canada convoy protest in Ottawa.

Lich was among the organizers of the Yellow Vest protests in Alberta in 2018 and 2019. Based in Alberta, Lich was also an early leader in the Western Canada secession Wexit movement, which later became the Wildrose Independence Party of Alberta. In 2022, she was one of three organisers of the Canada convoy protests in Ottawa. She was arrested in Ottawa on February 17, 2022 and initially denied bail. Upon appeal she was released, then re-arrested and denied bail again. Another appeal in July 2022 led to her re-release.

Early life 
Lich was born in Saskatoon and lives in Medicine Hat, Alberta.

Career 
Lich has predominately worked in logistics in the energy field, including as a base administrator for STEP Energy Services, and also as a fitness instructor. She was a musician in the Alberta-based band Blind Monday.

Activism and politics

Yellow vest movement 
Lich organized the yellow vest protests in Medicine Hat in 2019. Following death threats made towards Prime Minister Justin Trudeau, Lich debated a name change for the group to distance their aims from those promoting violence.

Western Canada secessionism 
She opposed the Oil Tanker Moratorium Act and Bill-69 that regulated the oil industry in Canada. Lich advocates against legislation that does not take regional differences into account. In 2020, she opined that there are different needs for legislation on gun control in downtown Toronto compared to rural Alberta.  As a member of the Maverick Party, she advocated for a unified voice of people in western Canada to push for constitutional reform as a first priority and secession as the second.

Lich was a leader in the Wexit movement which later became the Wildrose Independence Party of Alberta. Lich left the Wildrose party to join the separatist Maverick Party where she served as a member of its first governing council. In 2022, she was the secretary of the Maverick Party's Western Canadian Governing Council.

Lich was involved in the 2018 United We Roll protest convoy.

COVID-19 pandemic 

Speaking at a news conference on February 3, 2022, Lich called on all levels of government in Canada to put an end to COVID-19 public health measures. The next day, she praised Saskatchewan Premier Scott Moe for ending provincial COVID-19 restrictions.

Lich was a primary organizer of the 2022 Canada convoy protest in Ottawa, as well as a spokesperson and an organizer of the fundraising of the protest. She led negotiations on behalf of the convoy movement with Ottawa Mayor Jim Watson.

Lich spoke publicly about how she felt offended that the protesters were being portrayed in the media as racist and sexist. Lich has been outspoken against forms of extremism at the protests.

Arrest, bail, and trial 
Lich was arrested in Ottawa on February 17, 2022, accused of counselling to commit mischief. Justice Julie Bourgeois denied her application for bail on February 22, 2022. Diane Magas, defence lawyer for Lich, expressed concern about the neutrality of Justice Bourgeois on the basis that she ran for a federal Liberal Party seat in 2011.  Her denial of bail was protested in Ottawa. On March 7, 2022, the bail denial was overturned, and Lich was granted bail on the conditions that she refrain from use social media, and that she leave Ottawa within 24 hours and the province of Ontario within 72 hours, and to only return to the province for court-related reasons. Additional conditions prohibit her use of social media, and prohibit contact with other protests organizers.

On March 24, 2022, an additional six charges were laid against Lich: counselling mischief, mischief, counselling to obstruct police, obstructing police, counselling intimidation, and intimidation by blocking and obstructing one or more highways.

On April 26, 2022, Calgary-based Justice Centre for Constitutional Freedoms announced that Lich will be awarded The George Jonas Freedom Award for her work during the Canada convoy protest. On June 27, 2022, Lich was re-arrested by the Royal Canadian Mounted Police in Alberta for allegedly breaching her bail conditions. Lich attended a Justice Centre for Constitutional Freedoms award ceremony on June 17 and met convoy organizer Tom Marazzo, with whom she had been ordered to have no contact. On July 8, Lich's bail application was denied, although that decision was overturned on July 26.

Lich's trial is scheduled for September 5, 2023 and is expected to last 16 days.

Family life 
Lich is married to Dwayne Lich, and is both a mother and a grandmother; her daughter was born premature. She has publicly claimed Métis heritage.

See also
 Pat King
 Christopher John Barber
 James Bauder
 Chris Sky
 COVID-19 pandemic in Canada
 COVID-19 protests in Canada

References

Living people
People from Medicine Hat
Maverick Party
Wildrose Party
Musicians from Alberta
Women activists
Year of birth missing (living people)
Protesters involved in the Canada convoy protest